The All American Futurity is a race for two-year-old American Quarter Horse racehorses run at Ruidoso Downs Race Track in Ruidoso Downs, New Mexico on Labor Day. It is the last leg of the AQHA Triple Crown that has only been won once, by Special Effort in 1981. A $4 million bonus was once offered to the horse that could sweep all three Triple Crown races. It started in 1959, with a purse of $129,686.85. It has always billed itself as the richest race in American Quarter Horse racing; in 1978, the purse was over a million dollars and in 1982, the winner's portion of the purse totaled over a million dollars for the first time. The 1980 edition was carried live in prime-time on CBS. The 2020 version of the race will have a purse of $3,000,000 with the winners share being $1,500,000, making it one of the richest races in North America.

The track record was set at this race in 2006, when No Secrets Here finished in 20.886 seconds for 440 yards, for an average speed of 43.091 miles/hr.

Winners by year

References

Further reading
 Wiggins, Walt The Great American Speedhorse: A Guide to Quarter Racing New York: Sovereign Books 1978

External links

 Video of the first All American Futurity in 1959
 Ruidoso Downs History of the All American Futurity accessed on September 24, 2007

Horse races in New Mexico
Sports in New Mexico
1959 establishments in New Mexico
Recurring sporting events established in 1959